Magellan Financial Group is an Australian investment manager focusing on global equities and global listed infrastructure.

MFG funds are available to retail and institutional clients in both Australian Securities Exchange-listed and unlisted forms. As of 31 December 2020, institutional clients held A$73.9 billion of assets under management, composing 73% of total.

Investment 
Alongside the dominant funds management business segment where the majority of operations are concentrated on the Group balance sheet includes a Principal Investments portfolio that has historically been composed of internal holdings in Magellan funds.

In the second half of 2020, MFG commenced significantly expanding its Principal Investments segment to include an external portfolio, initially undertaking three investments:
 Sep 2020: A$156 million investment in Barrenjoey Capital Partners, a newly established full service investment bank start-up (40% non-dilutive economic interest, 5% voting interest);
 Oct 2020: A$20 million investment in FinClear Holdings Limited, a provider of trading technology and infrastructure (16% shareholding);
 Jan 2021: A$95.4 million investment in fast food restaurant chain Guzman y Gomez (11% shareholding).

History 
MFG was co-founded in 2006 by Hamish Douglass and Chris Mackay off the back of careers in investment banking. The MFG entity was established through a complex recapitalisation deal where an existing listed vehicle—the underperforming Pengana HedgeFunds Group—was taken control of and renamed, severing formal ties with the previous entity.
Pengana had been founded in 2003 by Malcolm Turnbull, who was later to become Australian prime minister, and a merchant banking colleague, Russell Pillemar. The Turnbull family retained 20 per cent of the new company after the merger.

Douglass and Mackay used their contacts to raise approximately A$100 million in initial working capital for Magellan and to seed the investment strategies. At the same time, A$378 million was raised to establish the Magellan Flagship Fund in a closed-ended listed investment company structure (ASX code: MFF).

In July 2007, MFG launched the Magellan Global Fund and Magellan Infrastructure Fund as unlisted trusts, providing A$15 million and A$5 million of seed capital respectively. As at 31 December 2020, their direct successor funds have increased to about A$15.6 billion and A$2.5 billion respectively, though more broadly the underlying strategies have increased to A$75.1 billion in Global Equities and A$18.2 billion in Global Listed Infrastructure, across a number of investment vehicle variations.

In December 2021, Brett Cairns resigned from his position as CEO.  In March 2022, co-founder Hamish Douglass resigned from the Magellan board and co-founder Chris Mackay took up the role of Chairman. David George was appointed CEO in May 2022.

References

External links 
 Official website

Companies listed on the Australian Securities Exchange
Australian companies established in 2006
Financial services companies established in 2006
Investment companies of Australia
Financial services companies based in Sydney